Acacia lobulata, commonly known as Chiddarcooping wattle, is a shrub of the genus Acacia and the subgenus Plurinerves that is endemic to a small area of south western Australia. It was declared as rare flora in 1997 and is now listed a Endangered under the Environment Protection and Biodiversity Conservation Act 1999.

Description
It has smooth textured bark and slightly angled, warty and resinous branchlets. Like most species of Acacia it has phyllodes rather than true leaves. The dull grey-green phyllodes are asymmetrical and have curved, pointed tips. It blooms in July and produces yellow flowers.

Distribution
It is native to a small area in the Wheatbelt and Goldfields-Esperance regions of Western Australia where it is commonly situated on low granitic breakaways growing in gritty loam or sandy soils. The range of the plant is only about  containing three populations that is adjacent to the Chiddarcooping Nature Reserve with the Westonia and Nungarin Shires as a part of shrubland or open woodland communities containing species including Acacia andrewsii, Daviesia nematophylla, Eucalyptus yilgarnensis, Melaleuca uncinata and Austrodanthania setacea''.

See also
List of Acacia species

References

lobulata
Acacias of Western Australia
Taxa named by Bruce Maslin
Plants described in 1990